Kim Sung-tae (born May 23, 1958) is a South Korean politician who was a labor activist.

Early life and career 
Kim Sung-tae was born on 9 July 1958 in Jinju, South Gyeongsang Province. He worked as a labor activist in the Federation of Korean Trade Unions as a young man.

Political career 
He was elected in the 1998 local elections and served as the Seoul Metropolitan Council member of the National Congress for New Politics. Later, he moved to the Millennium Democratic Party and the Uri Party, and joined the conservative Grand National Party for the first time in 2008. Then, he ran for the 2008 legislative election and won.

After the 2016 South Korean political scandal, he defected from the Saenuri Party in December 2016 and joined the Bareun Party, but was reinstated in May 2017, before the presidential election. In November 2017, he was elected floor leader of the Liberty Korea Party. Later, In June 2018, when Hong Jun-pyo resigned his party leadership, he assumed the acting leader.

References

External links 
 
 
 Kim Sung-tae's blog

1958 births
Living people
Gim clan of Gyeongju
People from Jinju
People from South Gyeongsang Province
Liberty Korea Party politicians
South Korean Buddhists